HIP 85605 is a star in the constellation Hercules with a visual apparent magnitude of 11.03. It was thought to be a M dwarf or K-type main-sequence star potentially  from the Sun  and possibly a companion of the brighter star HIP 85607, but they are now known to be an optical double. (HIP 85605 is 1,790 ± 30 light years away, and HIP 85607 is 1,323 ± 13 light years away)

The original Hipparcos parallax measurement in 1997 was 202 mas, which would place it 16.1 light-years from the Solar System. In 2007, van Leeuwen revised the number to 147 mas, or 22.2 light-years. With a parallax of 147 mas (0.147 arcseconds), HIP 85605 is unlikely to be one of the 100 closest star systems to the Sun. In that case its gravitational influence could have disrupted the orbits of comets in the Oort cloud and caused some of them to enter the inner Solar System. 

With the release of Gaia DR2, it was determined that HIP 85605 is actually a much more distant 1790 ± 30 light-years away, and as such will not be passing remotely close to the Sun at any point in time.

See also
 Scholz's Star
 Gliese 710
 List of nearest stars and brown dwarfs

Notes

References

External links
Frequently asked questions to Close encounters of the stellar kind by C.A.L. Bailer-Jones

K-type main-sequence stars
Hercules (constellation)
085605